Neils Addis Priestley (8 September 1903 – 12 September 1984) was an Australian rules footballer who played for the Hawthorn Football Club in the Victorian Football League (VFL).

Notes

External links 

1903 births
1984 deaths
Australian rules footballers from Victoria (Australia)
Hawthorn Football Club players
Australian twins